Baidyanath Group is an Indian pharmaceutical firm specialising in Ayurvedic medicines.

History 
Shree Baidyanath Ayurved Bhawan (Pvt) Limited was founded in 1917 by two brothers, Vaidya Pandit Ram Narayan Sharma and his brother Pandit Ram Dayal Joshi with a vision of providing effective and readily available medicines to the population of India. Sharma and Pandit started a large scale production of Ayurvedic formulations from the centers: Kolkata (1921), Patna (1940), Jhansi (1941), Nagpur https://www.baidyanath.co/ (1942) and Prayagraj (1958).

Under the flagship of Shree Baidyanath Ayurved Bhawan, this expansion did not prove sufficient, and a new work came up at Baddi (Solan), Himachal Pradesh in the year 1995. Now, new plants exist at Barotiwala (Himachal Pradesh), Kashipur (Uttarakhand), and Seoni (Madhya Pradesh). The current Managing Director Of Baidyanath Group is Shri. Ram K Sharma at Kolkata and Shri. Suresh Kumar Sharma at Nagpur.

In 2017, the group completed 100 years and decided to foray into the FMCG market with the introduction of new products like Amla, Aloe vera, Karela Jamun, Giloy varieties, and Herbal Tea.

The age-old ayurvedic brand not only sells its products through offline channels, but also through various online platforms. During COVID-19 times, Baidyanath’s participated in one of the biggest online events, Amazon’s Prime Day, to ensure that some of their best immunomodulators seamlessly reach their customers’ doorsteps with the help of Amazon. Also, the demand for this brand’s ayurvedic products increased during the COVID phase, especially for immunity boosters such as Giloy, Giloy Batti, and Chyavanprash.

Baidyanath Group awarded 1.5 lakh INR for the best research paper or book on Ayurveda every year during 2016-19. The group also facilitated the practitioners of Ayurveda as a part of Dhanwantari Jayanti Celebrations.

See also
 Rasayana
 Triphala
 Churna
 Tinospora cordifolia
 Chyavanprash
 Ashwagandha
 Shilajit
 Convolvulus prostratus

References

External links
Baidyanath - Kolkata Group
https://www.baidyanath.co/

Pharmaceutical companies of India
Pharmaceutical companies established in 1917
Ayurvedic companies